The women's 50 metre butterfly event at the 2002 Commonwealth Games took place 30–31 July. The heats and the semi were held on 30 July, the final on 31 July.

Results

Final

Key: WR = World record

Semifinals

Preliminaries

References
Results

Swimming at the 2002 Commonwealth Games
Common